The 2015 CECAFA Cup is the 38th edition of the annual CECAFA Cup, an international football competition consisting of the national teams of member nations of the Council for East and Central Africa Football Associations (CECAFA). It took place in Ethiopia from 21 November to 5 December 2015.

The tournament was initially scheduled to be hosted in Rwanda. However, in June 2015, it was announced that Ethiopia replaced Rwanda as host due to Rwanda's preparation to host the 2016 African Nations Championship.

Participants
The following teams were confirmed to be participating in the tournament:

Notes
Eritrea national football team refused to participate due to the country's political tensions with hosts Ethiopia.
A draw containing Zambia was released to the press on 9 November 2015 but appeared to be inaccurate due to Malawi's inclusion.

Venues

Match officials
Referees

Assistant referees

Group stage

The draw result was announced by CECAFA on 11 November 2015.

If two or more teams were equal on points on completion of the group matches, the following criteria were applied to determine the rankings (in descending order):

 Number of points obtained in games between the teams involved;
 Goal difference in games between the teams involved;
 Goals scored in games between the teams involved;
 Away goals scored in games between the teams involved;
 Goal difference in all games;
 Goals scored in all games;
 Drawing of lots.

Group A

Group B

Group C

Ranking of third-placed teams
The two best ranked third-placed teams also advance to the quarter-finals.

Knockout stage

Bracket

Quarter-finals

|}

Semi-finals

|}

Third place match

|}

Final

|}

Goalscorers

5 goals
 Athar El Tahir

3 goals
 Jacques Tuyisenge
 John Bocco
 Farouk Miya

2 goals

 Jacob Keli
 Michael Olunga
 Chiukepo Msowoya
 Bruno Martinez
 Elias Maguli
 Simon Msuva
 Caesar Okhuti
 Suleiman Kassim

1 goal

 Amissi Tambwe
 Didier Kavumbagu
 Behailu Girma
 Mohammed Nasser
 Gatoch Panom
 John Banda
 Gerald Phiri, Jr.
 Dalitso Sayilesi
 Yussufu Habimana
 Hegman Ngomirakiza
 Dominic Abuyo
 James Moga
 Faris Abdalla
 Walaa Eldin Musa
 Said Juma
 Frank Kalanda
 Erisa Ssekisambu
 Khamis Mcha Khamis

Own goal
 Salim Mbonde (playing against Ethiopia)

Source:

References

 
CECAFA Cup
CECAFA Cup
CECAFA Cup
International association football competitions hosted by Ethiopia